The 1975 European Formula Two season was contested over 14 rounds. Automobiles Martini driver Jacques Laffite clinched the championship title.

Calendar

Note:

Race 2 3, 4, 6, 9, 10, 11, 12 and 14 were held in two heats, with results shown in aggregate.

Race 14 was won by a graded driver, all FIA graded drivers are shown in Italics

Final point standings

Driver

For every race points were awarded: 9 points to the winner, 6 for runner-up, 4 for third place, 3 for fourth place, 2 for fifth place and 1 for sixth place. No additional points were awarded. The best 7 results count. No driver had a point deduction.

Note:

Only drivers which were not FIA graded were able to score points.

References

Formula Two
European Formula Two Championship seasons